The 1997–98 MetJHL season is the 7th and final season of the Metro Junior A Hockey League (MetJHL). The 16 teams of the Central, Eastern, and Western Divisions competed in a 50-game schedule.  The top 12 teams made the playoffs.

The winner of the MetJHL playoffs, the Wexford Raiders, failed to defeat the Milton Merchants of the OPJHL for the OHA's Buckland Cup.

Changes
MetJHL rejoins the Ontario Hockey Association.
Pittsburgh Jr. Penguins join MetJHL.
Muskoka Bears become Huntsville Wildcats.
Thornhill Islanders become Thornhill Rattlers.
Aurora Tigers leave MetJHL for OPJHL.
At the end of the season, league closes doors and teams merge with OPJHL.

Final standings
Note: GP = Games played; W = Wins; L = Losses; OTL = Overtime losses; SL = Shootout losses; GF = Goals for; GA = Goals against; PTS = Points; x = clinched playoff berth; y = clinched division title; z = clinched conference title

1997-98 MetJHL Playoffs

Preliminary
Oshawa Legionaires defeated Shelburne Wolves 3-games-to-none
Syracuse Jr. Crunch defeated Pickering Panthers 3-games-to-2
Thornhill Rattlers defeated Huntsville Wildcats 3-games-to-1
Durham Huskies defeated Markham Waxers 3-games-to-1
Quarter-final
Caledon Canadians defeated Durham Huskies 3-games-to-none
Wexford Raiders defeated Quinte Hawks 3-games-to-none
Oshawa Legionaires defeated Wellington Dukes 3-games-to-2
Syracuse Jr. Crunch defeated Thornhill Rattlers 3-games-to-1
Semi-final
Caledon Canadians defeated Syracuse Jr. Crunch 4-games-to-3
Wexford Raiders defeated Oshawa Legionaires 4-games-to-2
Final
Wexford Raiders defeated Caledon Canadians 4-games-to-3

OHA Buckland Cup Championship
Best-of-7 series
Milton Merchants (OPJHL) defeated Wexford Raiders 4-games-to-1
Milton Merchants 11 - Wexford Raiders 2
Milton Merchants 3 - Wexford Raiders 2 2OT
Milton Merchants 6 - Wexford Raiders 1
Wexford Raiders 4 - Milton Merchants 3 OT
Milton Merchants 6 -  Wexford Raiders 1

See also
 1998 Royal Bank Cup
 Dudley Hewitt Cup
 List of Ontario Hockey Association Junior A seasons
 Ontario Junior A Hockey League
 Northern Ontario Junior Hockey League
 1997 in ice hockey
 1998 in ice hockey

References

External links
 Official website of the Ontario Junior Hockey League
 Official website of the Canadian Junior Hockey League

Metro Junior A Hockey League seasons
MetJHL